The 1971 Tour de Romandie was the 25th edition of the Tour de Romandie cycle race and was held from 4 May to 9 May 1971. The race started in Geneva and finished in Lugano. The race was won by Gianni Motta.

General classification

References

1971
Tour de Romandie
Tour de Romandie